Chitri Dam, is an earthfill dam on Chitri river near Ajara, Kolhapur district in state of Maharashtra in India.

Specifications
The volume content is

Purpose
 Irrigation
 Power House

See also
 Dams in Maharashtra
 List of reservoirs and dams in India

References

Dams in Kolhapur district
Dams completed in 2001
2001 establishments in Maharashtra